Captain John Lawrence Cosgrave Murdoch  (July 18, 1908 – October 10, 1944) was a Canadian rower who competed in the 1928 Summer Olympics.

In 1928 he won the bronze medal as member of the Canadian boat in the eights competition. An officer with the Royal Canadian Artillery, he died in the Netherlands during the Second World War.

References

External links
 Olympic profile
 https://www.cwgc.org/find-records/find-war-dead/casualty-details/2083391/john-lawrence-murdoch/

1908 births
1944 deaths
Canadian male rowers
Olympic bronze medalists for Canada
Olympic rowers of Canada
Rowers at the 1928 Summer Olympics
Olympic medalists in rowing
Medalists at the 1928 Summer Olympics
Canadian military personnel killed in World War II
Canadian Army personnel of World War II

Royal Regiment of Canadian Artillery officers